Netsanet Achamo (born December 14, 1987) is an Ethiopian long-distance runner.

She finished in 4th at the 2006 African Championships in Athletics in the 3000 metres steeplechase.

Achamo competed at the 2007 World Championships in Athletics in the 3000 metres steeplechase, but did not make it out of the heats.

She captured bronze at the 2007 All-Africa Games in the 3000 metres steeplechase.

Achamo won the 2011 Olomouc Half Marathon, 2012 Mumbai Marathon, and the 2012 Hamburg Marathon.

References

External links

Living people
1987 births
Ethiopian female long-distance runners
Ethiopian female marathon runners
Ethiopian female steeplechase runners
African Games bronze medalists for Ethiopia
African Games medalists in athletics (track and field)
Athletes (track and field) at the 2007 All-Africa Games
21st-century Ethiopian women